Corine van der Zijden (born 16 November 1995) is a Dutch former professional racing cyclist, who rode for UCI Women's Team Feminine Cycling Team in 2015. In 2012, she won the junior women's time trial at the UEC European Road Championships.

See also
 List of 2015 UCI Women's Teams and riders

References

External links

1995 births
Living people
Dutch female cyclists
People from Vianen
Cyclists from Utrecht (province)
21st-century Dutch women